Imjin thottimvirus (MJNV) is a single-stranded, enveloped, negative-sense RNA virus of the orthohantavirus genus in the Bunyavirales order. It is a newly identified hantavirus isolated from the lung tissues of Ussuri white-toothed shrews of the species Crocidura lasiura (order Soricomorpha, family Soricidae, subfamily Crocidurinae) captured near the demilitarized zone in the Republic of Korea during 2004 and 2005.

Virology 
Phylogenetic analyses demonstrates a common ancestry with Thottopalayam thottimvirus suggesting early evolutionary divergence. It is still unknown if MJNV is pathogenic for humans.

MJNV has been shown to be a genetically unique hantavirus. Multiple strains have been isolated from the lung tissues of Ussuri white-toothed shrews captured between 2004 and 2010. Partial M- and L-segment sequences from lung tissues of 12 of 37 (32.4%) anti-MJNV IgG antibody-positive shrews revealed that the 12 MJNV strains differed by 0–12.2% and 0–2.3% at the nucleotide and amino acid levels. A similar degree of nucleotide and amino acid difference was found in a 632-nucleotide length of the L segment of nine MJNV strains. Phylogenetic analyses demonstrated a geographic relationship similar to the phylogeography of rodent-borne hantaviruses.

See also 
 Sangassou virus
 Sweating sickness, which may have been caused by a hantavirus
 1993 Four Corners hantavirus outbreak

References

External links 

"Hantaviruses, with emphasis on Four Corners Hantavirus" by Brian Hjelle, M.D., Department of Pathology, School of Medicine, University of New Mexico
 CDC's Hantavirus Technical Information Index page
 Virus Pathogen Database and Analysis Resource (ViPR): Bunyaviridae
 Occurrences and deaths in North and South America

Viral diseases
Hantaviridae
Hemorrhagic fevers